Olyra horae is a species of longtail catfish native to India where it occurs in Meghalaya and Myanmar where it is found in Indawgyi Lake.

References

Bagridae
Fish of India
Fish of Myanmar
Fish described in 1929